is a Japanese actor.

Biography
Nishida was born in Kagoshima, Kagoshima Prefecture. He has a family relationship Bakumatsu scholar and poet Hatta Tomonori. Nishida graduated from Kagoshima Municipal Kamoike Junior High School, from Kagoshima Prefectural Konan High School, and from Nihon University College of Art.

After graduating from university he started performing in the theater. Nishida's acting experience was from the film, Mr. Mrs. Miss Lonely. He debuted in the television drama, Kaikyō.

While acting, Nishida once debuted as a singer in 1984 with the single, "Amadare". Since he is born in Kagoshima, he gives a Kagoshima dialect in television dramas.

Nishida also became a producer and created an office called Paddy House.

Filmography

TV series

Films

Stage

Radio

Dialect

Discography

References

External links
 

Japanese male actors
1955 births
Living people
People from Kagoshima